Lashburn is a town in Saskatchewan, Canada. It is located 35 km (22 miles) east of Lloydminster and 107 km (66 miles) west of North Battleford on the Yellowhead Highway, on the banks of the Battle River. It was founded in 1903 with the arrival of the Barr Colonists, led by Isaac Barr (an Anglican priest).

Demographics 

Notable people
Henry Bonli (1927-2011), painter and interior designer
Dwight Carruthers, played two games in the NHL for the Detroit Red Wings and Philadelphia Flyers
Braden Holtby (born September 16, 1989) NHL goaltender, Stanley Cup Champion 2017–2018 season with Washington Capitals
John C. Waldron (1900-1942) Lieutenant Commander, US Navy, and leader of Torpedo Squadron Eight attached to the U.S.S. Hornet. The squadron was decimated at the Battle of Midway

See also 

 List of communities in Saskatchewan
 List of towns in Saskatchewan

References

Towns in Saskatchewan
Populated places established in 1903
1903 establishments in the Northwest Territories
Wilton No. 472, Saskatchewan